Otis Johnson (January 13, 1908 – February 28, 1994) was an American jazz trumpeter.

Life
Johnson was born on January 13, 1908 (some records have 1910) in Richmond, Virginia. He began his career in the late 1920s, working with Gene Rodgers, Henri Saparo, Eugene Kennedy, and Charlie Skeete. In 1929 he joined Luis Russell's band, and rejoined Kennedy's group before working with Benny Carter in 1934. He played with Charlie Turner and Willie Bryant in the mid-1930s, then with Louis Armstrong and Don Redman toward the end of the decade.

Military service
Johnson joined the 369th Coast Artillery of the New York Army National Guard on December 30, 1940, and separated on October 13, 1945, achieving the rank of T/4. He never returned to active performance after leaving the military.

Death
Johnson died on February 28, 1994.

References
Eugene Chadbourne, [ Otis Johnson] at Allmusic

Sources

1908 births
1994 deaths
20th-century American musicians
20th-century trumpeters
American jazz trumpeters
American male trumpeters
Musicians from Richmond, Virginia
New York National Guard personnel
Jazz musicians from Virginia
20th-century American male musicians
American male jazz musicians
United States Army personnel of World War II
United States Army non-commissioned officers